Thornes Football Club was a Wakefield, West Yorkshire based rugby side who played between 1878 and 1894.

They are best known for winning the Yorkshire Cup in 1882, beating Wakefield Trinity in a game described by Professor Tony Collins as "possibly the greatest upset in English rugby".

Henry Wigglesworth won a cap for England whilst at the club in the 1884 Home Nations Championship in the 1-goal to nil victory over Ireland at Lansdowne Road on Monday 4 February 1884.  He also played for Yorkshire.

References 

Defunct English rugby union teams
Sport in West Yorkshire
1878 establishments in England
1894 disestablishments in England
Rugby clubs established in 1878
Rugby clubs disestablished in 1894